Artemio Reyes (born September 22, 1986) is an American professional boxer. He held the WBC FECARBOX welterweight title in 2012.

Professional career
On October 28, 2011, Reyes upset undefeated prospect Javier Molina, this fight was the co main-event of a Showtime boxing card.

References

External links

American boxers of Mexican descent
Light-welterweight boxers
1986 births
Living people
American male boxers
People from San Bernardino, California